Armaghankhaneh (also Romanized as Armaghānkhāneh and Armaghān Khāneh; also known as Arāmkhāna, Armakhana, and Mazra‘eh-ye Qareh Dāsh) is a city in, and the capital of, Qareh Poshtelu District of Zanjan County, Zanjan province, Iran. At the 2006 census, its population was 1,581 in 376 households, when it was a village. The following census in 2011 counted 1,945 people in 449 households, by which time the village was elevated to the status of a city. The latest census in 2016 showed a population of 2,149 people in 572 households.

References 

Zanjan County

Cities in Zanjan Province

Populated places in Zanjan Province

Populated places in Zanjan County